Open field may refer to:

Open-field system, a system of agriculture prevalent throughout Europe from the Middle Ages to the 20th Century
Open fields doctrine, a U.S. legal doctrine used for evaluating claims of an unreasonable search 
Open Field, album by Taken By Trees
 Open Field (animal test), a measure of general locomotor activity in rodents